) was a town located in Minamitakaki District, Nagasaki Prefecture, Japan.

As of 2003, the town had an estimated population of 5,634 and a density of 173.67 persons per km². The total area was 32.44 km².

On October 11, 2005, Chijiwa, along with the towns of Aino, Azuma, Kunimi, Minamikushiyama, Mizuho and Obama (all from Minamitakaki District), was merged to create the city of Unzen.

External links
 Town of Chijiwa (archive)
 City of Unzen 

Dissolved municipalities of Nagasaki Prefecture